Nandivardhana was a Kshatriya King from the Ikshvaku dynasty and the ruler of the Nata, Ainwar(Light), Gyat or Jnatri clan in Kshatriya Kundagrama, a suburb of Vaishali (Basarh in modern-day Bihar). He was the elder brother of Mahavira, the 24th Jain Tirthankara. His father was Siddhartha.

References

6th-century BC Indian Jains
6th-century BC Indian monarchs
Jain monarchs
Mahavira